Yaroslava Shvedova was the defending champion from 2015, when the event was last held, but did not participate this year due to injury.

Belinda Bencic won the title, defeating Hsieh Su-wei 6–3, 6–4 in the final.

Seeds

Draw

Finals

Top half

Bottom half

Qualifying

Seeds

Qualifiers

Qualifying draw

First qualifier

Second qualifier

Third qualifier

Fourth qualifier

References
 Main draw
 Qualifying draw

Women's Singles
Hua Hin Championships - Singles
 in women's tennis